Claude Vilgrain (born March 1, 1963) is a Haitian-born Canadian former professional ice hockey right winger. He played in 89 National Hockey League games with the Vancouver Canucks, New Jersey Devils, and Philadelphia Flyers. He played in the 1988 Winter Olympics for the Canadian national team. He was raised in Quebec City.

Career statistics

Regular season and playoffs

International

External links
 

1963 births
Living people
Black Canadian ice hockey players
Canadian expatriate ice hockey players in Germany
Canadian expatriate ice hockey players in Switzerland
Canadian ice hockey right wingers
Cincinnati Cyclones (IHL) players
Detroit Red Wings draft picks
EHC Biel players
Frankfurt Lions players
Haitian emigrants to Canada
Haitian ice hockey players
Haitian Quebecers
Hershey Bears players
Ice hockey people from Quebec City
Ice hockey players at the 1988 Winter Olympics
Laval Voisins players
Milwaukee Admirals (IHL) players
New Jersey Devils players
Olympic ice hockey players of Canada
Sportspeople from Port-au-Prince
Philadelphia Flyers players
SC Bern players
SC Herisau players
Schwenninger Wild Wings players
Université de Moncton alumni
Utica Devils players
Vancouver Canucks players